This is a list of museums in Guinea-Bissau.

List 
National Ethnographic Museum (Guinea-Bissau)
Historical Museum of Cacheu

See also 
 List of museums

 
Guinea-Bissau
Museums
Museums
Guinea-Bissau

Museums